Pognana Lario is a comune (municipality) in the Province of Como in the Italian region Lombardy, located about  north of Milan and about  northeast of Como.

Pognana Lario borders the following municipalities: Faggeto Lario, Laglio, Nesso.

References

Cities and towns in Lombardy